Kung Fu Panda is an American media franchise that originally started in 2008 with the release of the animated feature film of the same name, produced by DreamWorks Animation. Following the adventures of the titular Po Ping (primarily voiced by Jack Black and Mick Wingert), a giant panda who is improbably chosen as the prophesied Dragon Warrior and becomes a master of kung fu, the franchise is set in a fantasy wuxia genre version of ancient China populated by anthropomorphic animals. Although his status is initially doubted, Po proves himself worthy as he strives to fulfill his destiny.

The franchise consists mainly of three CGI-animated films: Kung Fu Panda (2008), Kung Fu Panda 2 (2011), and Kung Fu Panda 3 (2016) with a fourth film in development for release in 2024, and three television series: Kung Fu Panda: Legends of Awesomeness (2011–2016), The Paws of Destiny (2018–2019), and The Dragon Knight (2022–). The first two films were distributed by Paramount Pictures, the third film was distributed by 20th Century Fox and the fourth will be distributed by Universal Pictures, while the television series respectively aired on Nickelodeon and Nicktoons, Amazon Prime, and Netflix. Four short films, Secrets of the Furious Five (2008), Secrets of the Masters (2011), Secrets of the Scroll, and Secrets of the Panda Paws (both 2016), and a television special, Kung Fu Panda Holiday (2010), have also been produced.

The franchise's first two features were nominated for the Academy Award for Best Animated Feature as well as numerous Annie Awards, and its first television series having won 11 Emmy Awards. The first three films were critical and commercial successes while the second film was the biggest worldwide box office success for a film directed solely by a woman (Jennifer Yuh Nelson) until Wonder Woman (2017). The series is additionally popular in China as an outstanding Western interpretation of the wuxia film genre.

Films

Kung Fu Panda (2008)

Po, a clumsy panda, is a kung fu fanatic who lives in the Valley of Peace and works in his goose father Mr. Ping's noodle shop, unable to realize his dream of learning the art of kung fu. One day, a kung fu tournament is held for the elderly spiritual leader of the valley, Grand Master Oogway, to determine the identity of the Dragon Warrior, the one kung fu master capable of understanding the secret of the Dragon Scroll, which is said to contain the key to limitless power. Everyone in the valley expects the Dragon Warrior to be one of the Furious Five—Tigress, Monkey, Mantis, Viper, and Crane—a quintet of kung fu warriors trained by Master Shifu to protect the valley. To everyone's surprise, Oogway chooses Po, who has accidentally stumbled into the tournament arena after arriving late via fireworks explosion.

Refusing to believe that Po can be the Dragon Warrior, Shifu subjects Po to torturous training exercises in order to discourage him into quitting. Determined to change himself into someone he can respect, Po perseveres in his training and befriends the Furious Five, who had previously mocked Po for his lack of skill in kung fu. Po soon learns that Tai Lung is approaching the Valley, an evil kung fu warrior who has escaped from prison to take revenge for being denied the Dragon Scroll, and despairs he will be unable to defeat him. However, Shifu discovers that Po is capable of martial arts when motivated by food, and successfully trains him to learn kung fu. After his training is complete, Po is given the Dragon Scroll, which he discovers to be blank. However, Po realizes that the key to limitless power lies within himself, allowing him to defeat Tai Lung and restore peace to the valley.

Kung Fu Panda 2 (2011)

Po now lives his dream as a kung fu master and protects the Valley of Peace alongside the Furious Five. However, he is thrown into internal conflict when he begins having flashbacks of his mother and learns from Mr. Ping that he was adopted as an infant. Shortly after, Po and the Five are sent on a mission to stop the evil peacock Lord Shen from using a newly developed weapon, the cannon, to conquer all of China and destroy kung fu tradition. Po remains tormented by thoughts of being abandoned by his real parents until he is guided by a wise old soothsayer to embrace his past, and remembers that his parents risked their lives to save him from Shen, who had set out to exterminate all pandas after learning of a prophecy that he would be defeated by "a warrior of black-and-white". Po achieves inner peace, which allows him to destroy Shen's new weapon, defeat Shen, and accept Mr. Ping as his father. However, during the last scene of the movie, it shows Po's biological father realizing his son is alive.

Kung Fu Panda 3 (2016)

Shortly after the events of the second film, Shifu relinquishes his duties as master of the Jade Palace to Po, claiming that the next step of his own apprenticeship is to oversee the Furious Five's training. While struggling with this new responsibility, Po rejoices upon reuniting with his biological father, Li, though Mr. Ping is less enthusiastic. However, news arrives that the spirit warrior General Kai has returned to the mortal realm and is 'collecting' Kung Fu masters from all over China, both living and dead, to serve in his army of Jade Zombies. Po and the others discover from a scroll left by Oogway that Kai can only be defeated by the power of Chi, a technique known only by the panda colonies; thus, Po and Li set to the secret Panda Valley in order to have Po learn it. Po eventually discovers, to his horror, that Li had deceived him, because the pandas have long forgotten about how to manipulate the Chi, and he just wanted to protect his son from Kai. Once making amends with both his adoptive and biological fathers, Po joins forces with Ping, Tigress, and the pandas to make a stand against Kai, all mastering the power of Chi in the process and using its power to destroy him for good. After returning to the Valley of Peace, Po spends his days spreading the teachings of Kung fu and Chi.

Kung Fu Panda 4 (2024)
In December 2010, DreamWorks Animation CEO Jeffrey Katzenberg said that the Kung Fu Panda film series was planned to have six films, or "chapters" altogether, of a "Student" and "Master" trilogy, with three sequels to follow Kung Fu Panda 3. The filmmakers of Kung Fu Panda 3 were asked about the possibility of a fourth film in August 2016; co-director Jennifer Yuh Nelson said: "It's one at a time. We want to make this a perfect jewel, and then we'll see what happens after that", with co-director Alessandro Carloni responding: "With the sequels, we don't want to try to have them feel open-ended. We want it to feel like a completed journey, and we feel this movie does. And then, if a fantastic story presents itself, great".

When asked about any updates on  Kung Fu Panda 4, Nelson replied in August 2018 that she did not know as she had always seen the series as a trilogy, but that she was open to the idea of a fourth installment as long as it focused on Po.

In August 2022, DreamWorks Animation confirmed that Kung Fu Panda 4 was in production and is set to be released on March 8, 2024.

Television specials and series

Kung Fu Panda Holiday (2010)

Kung Fu Panda Holiday (also known as Kung Fu Panda Holiday Special) is a 2010 television special that premiered on NBC on November 24. It tells a story of Po, who is assigned to host the annual Winter Feast by Master Shifu, despite his wishes to spend the holiday with Mr. Ping.

Kung Fu Panda: Legends of Awesomeness (2011–2014; 2016)

Kung Fu Panda: Legends of Awesomeness is an animated television series based on the Kung Fu Panda film series, set between the first two films. The show was originally intended to premiere in 2010, but was delayed and officially launched on Nickelodeon on November 7, 2011. Of the series's voice cast, only Lucy Liu, Randall Duk Kim, and James Hong reprise their roles from the films as Viper, Oogway, and Mr. Ping, respectively. The first season, consisting of 26 episodes, ended on April 5, 2012. The second season aired from April 6, 2012, to June 21, 2013, and also consisted of 26 episodes. A third season consisting of 28 episodes began airing June 24, 2013, going on an extended hiatus after June 22, 2014, before airing its last 10 episodes two years later, from February 15 to June 29, 2016, as a tie-in to the theatrical run of Kung Fu Panda 3.

Kung Fu Panda: The Paws of Destiny (2018–2019)

Kung Fu Panda: The Paws of Destiny is the second Kung Fu Panda animated series, set after the events of Kung Fu Panda 3. Across 26 episodes produced by DreamWorks Animation Television with Amazon Studios and ordered, and aired by Amazon Prime Video, the series was released in its 13-episode first season on November 16, 2018, and its 13-episode second and final season on July 4, 2019. The series follows Po on a fresh adventure, mentoring four young pandas (Nu Hai, Jing, Bao and Fan Tong), who happen upon a mystical cave beneath the Panda Village - and accidentally absorb the chi of the ancient and powerful Kung Fu warriors known as the four constellations. The four friends realize that they now have a new destiny - to save the world from an impending evil with their new-found Kung Fu powers. They are aided along their journey by Po, who finds himself faced with his biggest challenge yet - teaching this ragtag band of kids how to wield their strange powers.

Kung Fu Panda: The Dragon Knight (2022)

Kung Fu Panda: The Dragon Knight is the third Kung Fu Panda animated series, which premiered on Netflix on July 14, 2022, with Jack Black reprising his role as Po. The series follows Po as he must leave his home behind and embark on a globe-trotting quest for redemption and justice that finds him partnered up with a no-nonsense English knight known as the Wandering Blade. Rita Ora joined the cast as Wandering Blade and James Hong reprised his role as Mr. Ping.

Short films

Kung Fu Panda: Secrets of the Furious Five (2008)

Kung Fu Panda: Secrets of the Furious Five, or simply Secrets of the Furious Five, is an animated short film that serves as a semi-sequel (or spin-off) to Kung Fu Panda and appears on a companion disc of the original film's deluxe DVD release. It was later broadcast on NBC on February 26, 2009, and is available as a separate DVD as of March 24 the same year. The film has a framing story of Po (in computer animation), telling the stories of his comrades in arms, the Furious Five, which are depicted in 2D cel animation.

Kung Fu Panda: Secrets of the Masters (2011)

Kung Fu Panda: Secrets of the Masters is an animated short film released on December 13, 2011, as a special feature attached to the Kung Fu Panda 2 DVD and Blu-ray. It tells the backgrounds of the masters of Gongmen City: Thundering Rhino, Storming Ox, and Croc.

Kung Fu Panda: Secrets of the Scroll (2016)

Kung Fu Panda: Secrets of the Scroll is an animated short film officially released as a bonus feature in the Kung Fu Panda: Ultimate Edition of Awesomeness Blu-ray pack in January 2016. Secrets of the Scroll details the forming of the Furious Five, and their first fight together against a common enemy. Unlike previous Kung Fu Panda short films, Secrets of the Scroll has yet to be released on its own DVD or Blu-ray.

Panda Paws (2016)
Panda Paws, is a short film that was released with the home media of Kung Fu Panda 3. Panda Paws involves the character Mei Mei (voiced by Kate Hudson) competing with Bao at the "Spring Festival". A version of the short was previously released in theaters preceding the DreamWorks Animation film Home in 2015, with Rebel Wilson voicing Mei Mei, prior to her firing from Kung Fu Panda 3.

Cast and characters

Additional crew

Reception

Box office performance
The films series grossed over $1.8 billion making the Kung Fu Panda franchise the tenth  highest-grossing animated franchise and the third highest-grossing DreamWorks Animation's franchise behind Madagascar & Shrek.

Critical and public reception
Each Kung Fu Panda film has received highly positive reviews, with critics often praising the animation, voice acting, and character development.

Awards

Video games
 Kung Fu Panda is a video game loosely based on the first film, released by Activision in June 2008 for Microsoft Windows, Nintendo DS, PlayStation 2, PlayStation 3, Wii, and Xbox 360.
 Kung Fu Panda: Legendary Warriors is a sequel to the video game Kung Fu Panda. It was published by Activision on November 5 and December 5, 2008, for the Nintendo DS and Wii, respectively.
 Kung Fu Panda World is a virtual world online game released on April 12, 2010.
 Kung Fu Panda 2 is a video game that takes place after the events of the second film. It was developed and published by THQ on May 23, 2011, for Nintendo DS, PlayStation 3, Wii and Xbox 360.
 Kung Fu Panda: Showdown of Legendary Legends is a fighting game developed by Vicious Cycle Software and published by Little Orbit. The game was released for Microsoft Windows, Xbox One, Xbox 360, PlayStation 3, PlayStation 4, Nintendo 3DS and Wii U on December 1, 2015.
 A crossover event between Brawlhalla and Kung Fu Panda was released as downloadable content on March 24, 2021, adding Po, Tigress, and Tai Lung to the game as playable characters.
 A crossover between Mobile Legends: Bang Bang and Kung Fu Panda was released as skins for Akai (Po), Ling (Lord Shen), and Thamuz (Kai) on August 20, 2022.

Arena show
Directed by international entertainment director, Franco Dragone—best known for Le Rêve and House of Dancing Waters—Kung Fu Panda: Arena Spectacular is an in-progress live arena show, featuring characters from the Kung Fu Panda. Combining circus and Chinese acrobatics as well as arena show effects, the production was supposed to be released around the same time of Kung Fu Panda 2. After a multi city casting tour in 2010, the production went behind closed doors until late 2011 when a new set of audition dates were announced for the following year. However, shortly before the announced January 2012 auditions, both Franco Dragone and DreamWorks decided to postpone the live show's opening date, canceling all auditions. No further announcements have been made since.

Attractions
A themed area Po's Kung Fu Garden was opened in 2012 at DreamWorks Experience, one of the themed lands at the Australian theme park Dreamworld. As of 2012 Po's Kung Fu Garden consists only of a small area featuring a Po photo opportunity. In late 2012, additional rides and attractions were added to the area.

A multi-sensory attraction, based on Kung Fu Panda, opened at the DreamWorks Theatre on June 15, 2018, at Universal Studios Hollywood.

A Kung Fu Panda-themed children's play area opened at DreamWorks Water Park on October 1, 2020.

See also
Legend of a Rabbit

References

External links

 
DreamWorks Animation franchises
Film franchises introduced in 2008
Chinese culture
Children's film series
Trilogies